Kasarwadi railway station is a small suburban railway station of Pune Suburban Railway. The station is on the junction of Old Mumbai–Pune Highway and Pune–Nashik Highway. Station has two platforms and a foot overbridge. Nearby areas are Kasarwadi, Nashik Phata, Bhosari, Pimple Saudagar, Pimple Nilakh.

All local trains between Pune Junction–, Pune Junction–Talegaon, –Lonavala, Shivajinagar–Talegaon and Pune Junction– Passenger stops here.

References

Pune Suburban Railway
Pune railway division
Railway stations in Pune district
Transport in Pimpri-Chinchwad